Mayor of Rawalpindi is the mayor who heads the Municipal Corporation Rawalpindi (MCR), which controls the local government system of Rawalpindi, Pakistan.

Rawalpindi local government system 
There are 46 union councils in Municipal Corporation Rawalpindi (MCR), the body which controls local government of Rawalpindi. The union councils elect their chairmen and vice chairmen who then elect their mayor and deputy mayor respectively.

Multiple deputy mayors 
The seats of Rawalpindi deputy mayors have been increased from 1 to 5.

List of mayors of Rawalpindi 

Following is the list of mayors in recent time.

Local government elections 2015 

Local government election held in Rawalpindi on December 5, 2015

The mayor and Deputy Mayors of Rawalpindi have been delayed.

See also 

 Mayor of Islamabad
 Mayor of Lahore

References 

Lists of mayors
Mayors, Rawalpindi